Ronald J. Gilson (born 1946) is an American lawyer, focusing in corporate governance, law & economics, corporate finance, capital markets, mergers & acquisitions and securities regulation, currently the Charles J. Meyers Professor of Law and Business, Emeritus at Stanford Law School.

References

1946 births
Living people
Stanford Law School faculty
American lawyers
Columbia Law School faculty